Michelangelo Tamburini (27 September 1648 – 28 February 1730) was an Italian Jesuit, who was elected fourteenth Superior General of the Society of Jesus from January 31, 1706 to February 28, 1730.

After teaching Scholastic philosophy and theology for twelve years, Tamburini became rector of several colleges. He was chosen by Cardinal Reynold of Este as his private theologian, held the offices of secretary general and vicar to Thyrsus Gonzalez, and finally, on the latter's death, was elected general on 3 January 1706, a post which he occupied for 24 years.

Tamburini died at the age of 82.

References

1648 births
1730 deaths
17th-century Italian Jesuits
Superiors General of the Society of Jesus
Religious leaders from Modena
18th-century Italian Jesuits
17th-century Italian Roman Catholic theologians
Italian philosophers
18th-century Italian Roman Catholic theologians